Theo Kitt (born 14 October 1912, date of death unknown) was a West German bobsledder who competed in the mid-1950s. He won two bronze medals at the FIBT World Championships, winning them in the two-man event in 1953 and in the four-man event in 1954. Kitt also finished 11th in the two-man event at the 1952 Winter Olympics in Oslo.

References
1952 bobsleigh two-man results
Bobsleigh two-man world championship medalists since 1931
Bobsleigh four-man world championship medalists since 1930
Theo Kitt's profile at Sports Reference.com

Bobsledders at the 1952 Winter Olympics
German male bobsledders
Year of death missing
1912 births